"GOODMORNINGTOKYO!" is a single by American rapper Tokyo's Revenge released by Blac Noize! Recordings on October 18, 2019. The song peaked at No. 1 on the Bubbling Under Hot 100 and was certified gold by the RIAA.

Background 
Best created the song with producer Clifford "Cliiifford" Myrtil and features Best calling out phony artists. In 2019, Best became known with the song "Thot!" as it had become viral on TikTok, with fans using it for more than 200,000 videos. New fans then noticed "GOODMORNINGTOKYO!" a year later and used it for 1.1 million videos, making it his most popular song. The song climbed up and topped both Spotify’s Global Viral 50 and the Rolling Stone’s Trending 25 at No. 1 and 2 respectively, accumulating 26 million streams on Spotify.

Music video 
A music video for the song was released on February 17, 2020 and was directed by James "JMP" Pereira, edited by Chaz Smedley with cinematography by Russ Fraser. The music video was shot at Studios 60’s Grand 2 Stage in Los Angeles.

Charts

References 

2019 singles
2019 songs
Song articles with missing songwriters